Kate Miner may refer to:

 Kate Miner (musician), American singer and songwriter
 Kate Miner (actress) (born 1984), American actress, model, and musician